In enzymology, a progesterone 5alpha-reductase is an enzyme that catalyzes the chemical reaction

5alpha-pregnan-3,20-dione + NADP+  progesterone + NADPH + H+

Thus, the two substrates of this enzyme are 5alpha-pregnan-3,20-dione and NADP+, whereas its 3 products are progesterone, NADPH, and H+.

This enzyme belongs to the family of oxidoreductases, specifically those acting on the CH-CH group of donor with NAD+ or NADP+ as acceptor. It is a C21-steroid hormone that is a 5α-pregnane substituted with a oxo groups at positions 3 and 20. It is an intermediate in the conversion of progesterone to allopregnalone and isopregnanolone, other common forms of neurosteroids. The systematic name of this enzyme class is 5alpha-pregnan-3,20-dione:NADP+ 5-oxidoreductase. Other names in common use include steroid 5-alpha-reductase, and Delta4-steroid 5alpha-reductase (progesterone).

References

 
 

EC 1.3.1
NADPH-dependent enzymes
Enzymes of unknown structure